Erick Rivera may refer to:

 Erick Rivera (footballer, born 1989), Salvadoran football forward
 Erick Rivera (footballer, born 1992), Mexican football midfielder